The Mingbulak oil spill also known as the Fergana Valley oil spill was the worst terrestrial oil spill in the history of Asia. The oil spill was caused by a blowout on March 2, 1992 at the Mingbulak oil field in the Fergana Valley, Uzbekistan at well #5. The Crude oil released from the well burned for two months. In total,  were collected behind emergency dykes. The oil stopped flowing by itself. A total of 285,000 tons of oil were released, and it was the fifth largest oil spill in history. The spill is considered the largest inland spill in history.

See also 
List of oil spills

References 

Uzbek oil well collapses, fire extinguishes itself.  The Moscow Times, May 13, 1992...

Oil spills in Asia
1992 industrial disasters
Man-made disasters in Uzbekistan
1992 in Uzbekistan 
1992 disasters in Uzbekistan
1992 in the environment
March 1992 events in Asia